Kulderzipken is a Flemish television series that premiered in 1995. Two seasons of ten episodes each have been made since then. The final episode aired in 1996.

Concept 

Once upon a time there was, in country far, far, far away, a king called Jozef (Jan Decleir), and his wife, queen Angina (Karine Tanghe). King Jozef thought the time was right for his daughter, princess Prieeltje (Ianka Fleerackers), to get married and king Jozef set up a special contest. The first young man to pull the three golden hairs out of Mother Devil's head got the chance to marry the princess.

The contest was won by Kulderzipken (Michael Pas), a simple country lad. Both Prieeltje and her mother are very happy with the outcome, but King Jozef does not want a country lad as his son-in-law, and tries to chase Kulderzipken from his castle. King Jozef gets help from Mother Devil (Veerle Eyckermans), who wanted her son the devil (Frans Van der Aa) to win the contest instead.

Every episode, Kulderzipken has to fulfill a special quest. He gets help from the brothers Grimm (Warre Borgmans and Lucas Van den Eynde/Marc Van Eeghem), two servants in the castle who are very fond of courtesy and add mister in front of every title, even female ones.

External links 
 

Belgian children's television shows
1995 Belgian television series debuts
1996 Belgian television series endings
Belgian fantasy television series
Television about magic
Television shows based on fairy tales
Television series set in the Middle Ages
Fictional characters from Flanders